Choconta may refer to:
 Chocontá, a municipality in the department of Cundinamarca, Colombia
 Choconta (genus), a genus of froghoppers